is the Japanese term for a wind blowing strong down the slope of a mountain, occasionally as strong gusts of wind which can cause damage. Oroshi is a strong local wind across the Kanto Plain on the Pacific Ocean side of central Honshu. This term identifies a katabatic wind.

Literary references
The Oroshi wind is mentioned in Japanese poetry, including a poem which is included in the Hyakunin Isshu.

 
Many versions of this poem which were published during the Edo period have yama-oroshi instead of yama-oroshi yo, but the meaning is equivalent: the poet cries out to the wind; and he the cold down-draft to the heartless woman.

Oroshi is also a character in "La Horde du Contre-vent", an adventure book written by Alain Damasio, a french writer. In this story, Oroshi is the name of a wind mistress, she can read the wind as it is paper.

See also

Notes

References
 .  (1969). , Vol. 20, No. 2, pp. 111–174, 126 Tokyo, Meteorological Research Institute. OCLC 1761858
 Mostow, Joshua S., ed. (1996).  Pictures of the Heart: The Hyakunin Isshu in Word and Image. Honolulu: University of Hawaii Press. ; OCLC 645187818
 Simpson, John E. (1994). Sea Breeze and Local Winds. Cambridge: Cambridge University Press.  ;  OCLC 243798029

Winds